Rokautskyia latifolia is a species of flowering plant in the family Bromeliaceae, endemic to Brazil (the state of Espírito Santo). It was first described by Elton Leme in 1991 as Cryptanthus latifolius.

References

latifolia
Flora of Brazil
Plants described in 1991